The Price Villa is a historic house in Atchison, Kansas. It was built in 1872 for John M. Price, a politician. It was acquired by Benedictine Sisters in 1877, and it became home to Mount St. Scholastica College's Music department.

The house was designed by architects Thomas Wise and F. W. MeLaughlif in the Renaissance style. It has been listed on the National Register of Historic Places since March 16, 1972.

References

Houses on the National Register of Historic Places in Kansas
National Register of Historic Places in Atchison County, Kansas
Renaissance Revival architecture in Kansas
Houses completed in 1872